Ameeta Sinh (born Amita Kulkarni on 4 October 1962) is a politician from the state of Uttar Pradesh, India, who was formerly a national badminton champion. She has been Chairman of Jilla Panchayat in Amethi/Sultanpur district and has been elected Thrice as a Member of the Legislative Assembly for the Amethi Vidhan Sabha constituency in the Legislative Assembly of Uttar Pradesh. She was minister of state in the Government of Uttar Pradesh.

After the death of her first husband Syed Modi, in whose murder she and Sanjay Sinh were accused, she went on to marry Sanjay Sinh, a Bhartiya Janta Party (BJP) politician from Amethi who is close to the Nehru-Gandhi family and a descendant, by adoption, of the former royal family of Amethi.

Early life 
Ameeta Sinh was born on 4 October 1962.  She became a national champion in the sport of badminton during the 1970s. In 1984, she married another national champion, Syed Modi, whom she then partnered in a successful badminton career. Their marriage ended when Syed Modi was shot dead in 1988. While they were discharged of all charges, the CBI alleged that Ameeta and Sanjay were in a relationship, although Sanjay was still married at that time. The coup his first wife, Garima . A legal challenge to that divorce resulted in it being set aside in 1998 by the Supreme Court of India, although the couple still claim that they are legally wed. Aside from the three children whom he fathered with Garima, Sanjay has legally adopted Ameeta's daughter. Her daughter was born two months prior to the death of Syed Modi.

Sinh graduated from Dr. Ram Manohar Lohia Avadh University , Faizabad, in 2003 and was awarded a PhD in sociology by the same institution in 2011.

Ameeta Sinh has been a party to a public battle over an inheritance that has seen Sanjay and Garima making rival claims. Sanjay was adopted by the king of Amethi, Rananjay Singh, as his heir prior to the abolition of all royal privileges in India and as such he inherited the former royal estates. In 1989, he had removed Garima from the palace but in 2014 she and her children took up residence at another palace in Amethi, called Bhupati Bhawan, and refused to move. Local people gathered to support her, claiming that she, rather than Ameeta, was the real queen.

Political career 
Sinh was Chairman of Jilla Panchayat of Amethi/Sultanpur district between August 2000 and February 2002. She won the Amethi Vidhan Sabha seat as a Bharatiya Janata Party (BJP) candidate in the 2002 Uttar Pradesh state assembly elections, and again in the 2007 elections, this time as an INC candidate. Her husband had also been a BJP politician at the time of the 2002 elections, having begun his career with the INC, moved to the Janata Dal party and then to the BJP. He had returned to the INC in 2003. She was minister for technical education.

In 2012, Singh stood as an INC candidate in the Amethi constituency during the state legislative assembly elections of that year. She lost to Gayatri Prajapati of the Samajwadi Party. She contested the Sultanpur Lok Sabha constituency as an INC candidate for a seat in the Parliament of India in 2014 but finished third, with the winner being Varun Gandhi of the BJP.

In the 2017 Uttar Pradesh legislative assembly elections, Sinh contested the Amethi constituency as an INC candidate and had Garima Singh as one of her opponents, standing for the BJP. The BJP hoped to win the seat by exploiting local sympathy for Garima, who is a relative of V. P. Singh, a former Prime Minister of India. Both women named Sanjay Singh as their spouse in their election affidavits, and it was Garima who won the contest. BJP spokespeople claimed the result was indeed one based on elector's feelings about the long-running family drama. In July 2019, Ameeta Singh along with her husband Sanjaya Sinh joined Bharatiya Janata Party.

References

External links 

 
 http://indiatoday.intoday.in/story/syed-modi-murder-despite-protests-cbi-seems-unrelenting-in-its-pursuits/1/329822.html

1962 births
Living people
Indian female badminton players
Uttar Pradesh MLAs 2002–2007
Indian national badminton champions
Uttar Pradesh MLAs 2007–2012
21st-century Indian women politicians
21st-century Indian politicians
Indian National Congress politicians from Uttar Pradesh
Bharatiya Janata Party politicians from Uttar Pradesh
Janata Dal politicians
Samajwadi Janata Party politicians
People from Amethi